Gabija Šimkūnaitė (born 7 December 2002) is a Lithuanian chess player. She won the Lithuanian Women's Chess Championship (2021).

Biography 
In 2018 Gabija Šimkūnaitė shared 2nd-4th places in Lithuanian Women's Chess Championship but remained in 4th place according to additional indicators. In 2021 she won Lithuanian Women's Chess Championship. In 2022 Gabija Šimkūnaitė ranked in 4th place in Lithuanian Women's Chess Championship.

Gabija Šimkūnaitė played for Lithuania in the Women's Chess Olympiads:
 In 2022, at reserve board in the 44th Chess Olympiad (women) in Chennai (+7, =1, -2).

Gabija Šimkūnaitė played for Lithuania in the European Women's Team Chess Championships:
 In 2021, at third board in the 14th European Team Chess Championship (women) in Čatež ob Savi (+5, =1, -3).

References

External links 

2002 births
Living people
Sportspeople from Šiauliai
Lithuanian female chess players